Walter Leon Burton (March 13, 1935 – October 7, 2022) was an American professional football player who played 14 games for the New York Titans in one season of the American Football League (AFL) in 1960.  He earlier played college football at Arizona State University.

Early life
Burton was born in Flint, Michigan, on March 13, 1935.  He attended Flint Northern High School in his hometown, where he was a member of the football and track and field teams.  He then studied at Arizona State University, where he played for the Sun Devils from 1955 to 1958.  He established the school's freshman record with 694 rushing yards in 1955 (a mark that would stand until 2003).  During the 1957 season, Burton led the National Collegiate Athletic Association (NCAA) in rushing yards (1126), touchdowns (16), points (96), and yards from scrimmage (1320), while setting an NCAA record of 9.6 yards per carry.  The Sun Devils ultimately finished that year undefeated (10–0).  He had the fourth-most touchdowns (11) and points (66) in the NCAA in the following season.  Burton received first team All-Border Conference honors in 1957 and 1958.  He finished his college career ranked first all-time in regular-season rushing touchdowns (34), and second in rushing yards (2994).  He was selected by the San Francisco 49ers in the eighth round (87th overall) of the 1958 NFL Draft.

Professional career
Burton was released by the 49ers on account of his size and subsequently joined the Toronto Argonauts for one season.  He then signed with the New York Titans and made his AFL debut with the franchise on September 11, 1960, at the age of 25, in a 27–3 win against the Buffalo Bills.  He recorded the longest kickoff return in franchise history at 101 yards in a game against the Oakland Raiders on October 28 that year, which was ultimately the second-longest kickoff return in the league that year.  He later became the first Titans player to return two kickoffs for touchdowns in a single season.  Burton led the AFL in kick returns (30), kick return yards (862), and kick and punt returns (42), while finishing second in kick and punt return yards (955), fifth in punt returns (12), and ninth in punt return yards (93).  He went on to play for the Grand Rapids Blazers of the United Football League.

Honors
Burton was inducted into his alma mater's Sports Hall of Fame in 1978.  He was later recognized in ASU's Ring of Honor in October 2013.

Personal life
Burton's first marriage was to Ellen Marie Collins, who he met in high school, and together they had four children. 

Burton died in his sleep on October 7, 2022, in Las Vegas.  He was 87 years old.

See also
 List of NCAA major college football yearly rushing leaders
 List of NCAA major college football yearly scoring leaders

References

1935 births
2022 deaths
20th-century African-American sportspeople
African-American players of American football
American football halfbacks
Arizona State Sun Devils football players
New York Titans (AFL) players
Players of American football from Flint, Michigan